In statistical physics, directed percolation (DP) refers to a class of models that mimic filtering of fluids through porous materials along a given direction, due to the effect of gravity. Varying the microscopic connectivity of the pores, these models display a phase transition from a macroscopically permeable (percolating) to an impermeable (non-percolating) state. Directed percolation is also used as a simple model for epidemic spreading with a transition between survival and extinction of the disease depending on the infection rate.

More generally, the term directed percolation stands for a universality class of continuous phase transitions which are characterized by the same type of collective behavior on large scales. Directed percolation is probably the simplest universality class of transitions out of thermal equilibrium.

Lattice models 

One of the simplest realizations of DP is bond directed percolation. This model is a directed variant of ordinary (isotropic) percolation and can be introduced as follows. The figure shows a tilted square lattice with bonds connecting neighboring sites. The bonds are permeable (open) with probability  and impermeable (closed) otherwise. The sites and bonds may be interpreted as holes and randomly distributed channels of a porous medium.

The difference between ordinary and directed percolation is illustrated to the right. In isotropic percolation a spreading agent (e.g. water) introduced at a particular site percolates along open bonds, generating a cluster of wet sites. Contrarily, in directed percolation the spreading agent can pass open bonds only along a preferred direction in space, as indicated by the arrow. The resulting red cluster is directed in space.

As a dynamical process 
Interpreting the preferred direction as a temporal degree of freedom, directed percolation can be regarded as a stochastic process that evolves in time. In the case of bond DP the time parameter  is discrete and all sites are updated in parallel. Activating a certain site (called initial seed) at time  the resulting cluster can be constructed row by row. The corresponding number of active sites  varies as time evolves.

Universal scaling behavior 
The DP universality class is characterized by a certain set of critical exponents. These exponents depend on the spatial dimension . Above the so-called upper critical dimension  they are given by their mean-field values while in 
 dimensions they have been estimated numerically. Current estimates are summarized in the following table:

Other examples
In two dimensions, the percolation of water through a thin tissue (such as toilet paper) has the same mathematical underpinnings as the flow of electricity through two-dimensional random networks of resistors. In chemistry, chromatography can be understood with similar models.

The propagation of a tear or rip in a sheet of paper, in a sheet of metal, or even the formation of a crack in ceramic bears broad mathematical resemblance to the flow of electricity through a random network of electrical fuses. Above a certain critical point, the electrical flow will cause a fuse to pop, possibly leading to a cascade of failures, resembling the propagation of a crack or tear. The study of percolation helps indicate how the flow of electricity will redistribute itself in the fuse network, thus modeling which fuses are most likely to pop next, and how fast they will pop, and what direction the crack may curve in.

Examples can be found not only in physical phenomena, but also in biology, neuroscience, ecology (e.g. evolution), and economics (e.g. diffusion of innovation).

Percolation can be considered to be a branch of the study of dynamical systems or statistical mechanics. In particular, percolation networks exhibit a phase change around a critical threshold.

Experimental realizations 
In spite of vast success in the theoretical and numerical studies of DP, obtaining convincing experimental evidence has proved challenging. However, in 2007, critical behavior of DP was finally found in the electrohydrodynamic convection of liquid crystal, where a complete set of static and dynamic critical exponents and universal scaling functions of DP were measured in the transition to spatiotemporal intermittency between two turbulent states.

See also
 Percolation threshold
 Ziff–Gulari–Barshad model

Sources

Literature
 
 
 
 L. Canet: "Processus de réaction-diffusion : une approche par le groupe de renormalisation non perturbatif", Thèse. Thèse en ligne
 Muhammad Sahimi. Applications of Percolation Theory. Taylor & Francis, 1994.  (cloth),  (paper)
 Geoffrey Grimmett. Percolation (2. ed). Springer Verlag, 1999.

References

Sources

Percolation theory
Critical phenomena